The Nimbaye River is a river of northeastern New Caledonia. It has a catchment area of 321 square kilometres, and it ends its course in the commune of Ponérihouen.

See also
List of rivers of New Caledonia

References

Rivers of New Caledonia